Andrei Nikolayevich Knyazev (born 25 September 1974) is a former Russian professional football player.

Career
Knyazev began playing football with local side FC Metallurg Magnitogorsk. In 1995, he had a brief spell playing the Russian Top League with FC KAMAZ-Chally Naberezhnye Chelny, scoring one goal in seven league matches. He also represented Russia at the 1995 Summer Universiade in Japan. Knyazev didn't feature regularly for KAMAZ, and he returned to Metallurg the following season.

In 1997, Knyazev joined FC Rubin Kazan, then playing in the Russian Second Division. He scored 25 league goals in his first season to lead the club to promotion to the Russian First Division. After his success with Rubin, Knyazev had brief spells with FC Torpedo-ZIL Moscow and FC Sokol Saratov, playing in the Russian First Division before both clubs achieved promotion at the end of the 2000 season.

References

External links
 

1974 births
People from Magnitogorsk
Living people
Russian footballers
Association football forwards
Russian Premier League players
FC KAMAZ Naberezhnye Chelny players
FC Rubin Kazan players
FC Moscow players
FC Sokol Saratov players
FC Metallurg Lipetsk players
FC Arsenal Tula players
FC Spartak Nizhny Novgorod players
Sportspeople from Chelyabinsk Oblast